Drepana curvatula, the dusky hook-tip, is a moth of the family Drepanidae. It was first described by Moritz Balthasar Borkhausen in 1790 and it is found from Europe to Japan.

The wingspan is 34–42 mm. The moth flies from May to August depending on the location.

The larvae feed on alder, oak and birch.

Subspecies
Drepana curvatula curvatula (Europe)
Drepana curvatula acuta Butler, 1881 (Japan, south-eastern Russia, Kuril Islands, Korea, China: Manchuria)

References

External links

Moths and Butterflies of Europe and North Africa
Fauna Europaea
Lepiforum.de

Moths described in 1790
Drepaninae
Moths of Japan
Moths of Europe
Taxa named by Moritz Balthasar Borkhausen